The George N. Wade Memorial Bridge, also known as the North Bridge, carries Interstate 81 (I-81) and the Capital Beltway across the Susquehanna River in Harrisburg, Pennsylvania.

History and architectural features
Bridge construction began during the late 1960s and was completed in the early 1970s. 

It carries six lanes of traffic and has two collector road and five ramp connections. Average daily traffic counts for this section of I-81 are nearly 32,000 vehicles in each direction. 

A $36.5 million rehabilitation of the bridge began in 2009 and was scheduled to be completed in early 2012; however, additional repairs were undertaken in subsequent years.

See also
List of crossings of the Susquehanna River

References

Wade
Bridges over the Susquehanna River
Bridges completed in 1970
Road bridges in Pennsylvania
Interstate 81
Bridges on the Interstate Highway System